Takashi Ikegami (born February 1961) is a professor for at the University of Tokyo. He specializes in artificial life and complexity, and has been known to engage on the border between art and science.

External links
 Homepage at Tokyo University
 The case for complexity over simplicity in science (2012)
 

1961 births
Living people
Japanese roboticists
Academic staff of the University of Tokyo
Researchers of artificial life